Steven Delisle (born July 30, 1990) is a Canadian professional ice hockey defenceman. He is currently an unrestricted free agent who most recently played with HC Sparta Praha of the Czech Extraliga.

Playing career
Delisle was drafted 107th overall, in the 2008 NHL Entry Draft by the Columbus Blue Jackets from the Quebec Major Junior Hockey League. On May 6, 2010, he was signed to a three-year entry level contract to begin his professional career within the Blue Jackets organization.

On July 23, 2012, Delisle was traded by the Blue Jackets, along with Rick Nash and a conditional third round selection in the 2013 NHL Entry Draft, to the New York Rangers for Brandon Dubinsky, Artem Anisimov, Tim Erixon and a 2013 first round draft pick.

During the 2012-13 season, on April 3, 2013, Delisle was again included in a major trade between the New York Rangers and Columbus Blue Jackets, when he was returned to Columbus along with Marian Gaborik and Blake Parlett in exchange for Derick Brassard, John Moore, Derek Dorsett, and a sixth-round pick. Delisle was given permission to continue with the Greenville Road Warriors of the ECHL for the season, and was not tendered a qualifying offer to remain with the Blue Jackets at the conclusion of his contract.

On August 20, 2013, Delisle agreed to a one-year AHL contract with the Adirondack Phantoms, an affiliate of the Philadelphia Flyers.

Delisle signed a one-year contract with the Springfield Falcons on August 10, 2015. In the ensuing 2015–16 season, Delisle was a regular feature on the Falcons blueline, appearing in 56 games with 3 goals and 13 points.

Unsigned over the following summer, Delisle belatedly signed an ECHL contract into the 2016–17 season with the South Carolina Stingrays on November 1, 2016.

Delisle played a lone season in the Czech Extraliga (ELH) with HC Sparta Praha, contributing with 5 points in 45 games from the blueline. On June 27, 2019, Delisle left Prague as a free agent.

Career statistics

References

External links
 

Living people
1990 births
Adirondack Phantoms players
Canadian ice hockey defencemen
Chicago Express players
Columbus Blue Jackets draft picks
Connecticut Whale (AHL) players
Fort Wayne Komets players
Gatineau Olympiques players
Greenville Road Warriors players
HC '05 Banská Bystrica players
HC Sparta Praha players
Ice hockey people from Quebec
Lehigh Valley Phantoms players
Norfolk Admirals (ECHL) players
People from Lévis, Quebec
Rouyn-Noranda Huskies players
South Carolina Stingrays players
Springfield Falcons players
Löwen Frankfurt players
Canadian expatriate ice hockey players in the Czech Republic
Canadian expatriate ice hockey players in Slovakia
Canadian expatriate ice hockey players in the United States
Canadian expatriate ice hockey players in Germany